"Cold Blooded" is a funk song written and recorded by Rick James in 1983. James wrote the song about his relationship with actress Linda Blair.

Background and recording 
Rick James began dating Linda Blair in the fall of 1982. In early 1983, she aborted their baby then informed him she had been pregnant after the procedure. James was hurt by her decision. He wrote "Cold Blooded" about Blair. "It was about how Linda could freeze my blood," he wrote in his memoir.

During one of Blair's visits to James' home in Buffalo, he took her to his recording studio. She was interested in learning how to write music so he fired up his synthesizer and absentmindedly began noodling with the keys and came up with the bass line. Running with the idea, he played all the instruments on the track. Synth-based, it was a departure from James' previous guitar-based, horns-laced sides. He utilized the Roland TR series of drum machines which were dominant on the '80s-era Jimmy Jam-and-Terry Lewis-produced hits of The S.O.S. Band.

Released as the first single from the album of the same name, "Cold Blooded" spent six weeks at number one on the Billboard R&B Singles chart and reached number forty on the Hot 100.

Covers and sampling 
In 1999, the song was covered by American rapper Ol' Dirty Bastard and included on his album Nigga Please. The song was sampled by TLC on their third album FanMail on the interlude "Whispering Playa"; the sample was later removed on future versions of the album and replaced with a sample of the group's own song "U in Me".

Pop culture 
On Chappelle's Show, during an episode with a Rick James sketch, James, played by Chappelle, sings the song after punching Charlie Murphy.

The song was featured in the video game Grand Theft Auto: San Andreas on the fictional funk station, Bounce FM.

Chart performance

References

1983 songs
1983 singles
Rick James songs
Songs written by Rick James
Gordy Records singles
Song recordings produced by Rick James